In international rallying, Group R-GT (or sometimes Group RGT), is a formula of rally car defined by the FIA for GT cars introduced in 2011. Between 2014 and 2019 technical passports were issued for individual vehicles built by tuners. Since 2020 R-GT cars are required to be homologated by the manufacturer in common with other rally car formulae.

Internationally, R-GT cars compete in the FIA R-GT Cup, which is contested on tarmac rounds of the ERC and WRC. They are also eligible for the World Rally Championship and all the FIA's regional championships.

Technical regulations
The technical regulations are described in 2019 Appendix J, article 256 of the FIA sporting regulations for cars with technical passports. For homologated cars since 2020 the relevant document is 2021 Appendix J, article 256. In both cases the cars must be series production GT cars that must be two-wheel driven. A car with four-wheel drive can be used as a basis but must be transformed into a 2WD version. All cars must be fitted with a restrictor with a diameter determined by the FIA in order to achieve a weight/power ratio of 3.4 kg/hp (4.6 kg/kw, 294bhp/tonne).

History

Lotus Exige R-GT homologation

Lotus presented an R-GT version of their Exige S at the Frankfurt Motor Show 2011, but it wasn't until July 2012 before they achieved FIA homologation for what was the first car to compete in the R-GT category. The competition debut took place at the end of July at Rally Vinho da Madeira, with Portuguese driver Bernardo Sousa driving the car. After posting stage times in the top ten for the first two special stages, the car retired in the third stage because of an accident caused by an electronics glitch. After that, there were no further appearances of the Exige R-GT in international rallies and the homologation period lapsed in 2019.

Technical passports for individual cars
Between 2014 and 2019, the FIA issues technical passports for individual cars that are prepared to comply with the R-GT regulations. The first such appearance was Marc Duez who entered a Porsche 996 GT3 for the 2014 Monte Carlo Rally. He achieved some respectable stage times, but was forced to retire on the last day. At the 2014 Rallye Deutschland, Richard Tuthill entered with a modified Porsche 997 and finished as 27th (of 63 classified), thus realising the first finish of a Porsche at a WRC event since 1986.

FIA R-GT Cup
In 2015 the FIA organised the first international cup for R-GT cars. The first season was competed on five tarmac events of the WRC and ERC: Rallye Monte-Carlo, Ypres Rally, Rallye Deutschland, Rallye International du Valais and Tour de Corse.  The championship was won by François Delecour in a Tuthill-prepared Porsche 997. In 2016 the R-GT cup was not contested due to a lack of participants but interest rose again in 2017 with the introduction of the Abarth 124 R-GT. The first event of the 2017 FIA R-GT Cup, the 2017 Monte Carlo Rally, saw 4 participants in the R-GT category.

Abarth 124 R-GT

At the 2016 Geneva Motor Show the Abarth 124 Spider R-GT car was presented, and later made its debut at the 2017 Monte Carlo Rally. The entrants were François Delecour, Fabio Andolfi and Gabriele Noberasco. Two of the Abarths had to retire, but Noberasco classified second in the R-GT class.

Since 2019 the Abarth Rally Cup has run as a one-make series on selected rounds of the European Rally Championship. Title winners since its inaugural year have been Andrea Nucita (2019), Andrea Mabellini (2020) and Dariusz Poloński (2021).

Alpine A110 R-GT
The Alpine A110 Rally was announced in May 2019 and officially presented during the Rallye Mont-Blanc Morzine (5-7 September 2019). It was homologated by the FIA to Group R-GT specification in July 2020 and remains the only homologated R-GT car as of November 2021.

Champions

FIA R-GT Cup

Other starts in international rallies

Starts in R-GT Cup events are covered by the corresponding R-GT Cup season article and not listed below.

Notes

References

World Rally Championship
Rally groups
Racing car classes